The River Doon is a river in Ayrshire, Scotland. Its course is generally north-westerly, passing near to the town of Dalmellington, and through the villages of Patna, Dalrymple, and Alloway, birthplace of Robert Burns.  The source of the Doon is Loch Enoch, high in the Galloway Hills.

In the 1930s the Loch Doon was dammed to provide water to the Galloway Hydro Electric Scheme, today operated by Scottish Power.

The river is also the major setting for his lesser-known poem "The Banks O' Doon".

References

External links
River Doon at the Ayrshire Rivers Trust

Doon
Doon